BLTV may refer to:

Beautiful Life Television, formerly known as Buddha's Light Television, a television station in Taiwan
Boston Latino TV, a 2003–13 television show on Boston Neighborhood Network
Birmingham Local TV